Swiftcurrent Creek is a river in Mount Robson Provincial Park of British Columbia.

Course
During that time it flows through two small glacier lakes. At the outlet of the second lake the creek, quite large already, plunges down a headwall into the valley below, forming unofficially-named Swiftcurrent Falls, one of the higher waterfalls in Canada. The creek continues southwest for another . The creek then turns southeast for about  until its confluence with the Fraser. Bordering the creek on both sides are some swamp-like sections that some of the flow from the creek enters before re-entering the mainstream further downstream.

The creek is not entirely within Mount Robson Park; shortly above the bridge over the creek on the Yellowhead Highway the creek leaves the boundaries of the park.

See also
List of British Columbia rivers
Swift Current

References

Rivers of British Columbia
Tributaries of the Fraser River
Robson Valley
Rivers of the Canadian Rockies